Sterling Feore Slaughter Jr. (born November 18, 1941) is an American former professional baseball player who pitched for the Chicago Cubs of Major League Baseball in 1964.

In 1963, he had led the Double-A Texas League in earned run average (3.00). In 1964 he appeared in 20 Major League games pitched, six as a starting pitcher, and won two of six decisions, giving up 64 hits and 32 bases on balls in 51 innings pitched. He also recorded 32 strikeouts.

Both of his wins came against the Milwaukee Braves, including a complete game, 5–2 victory at Milwaukee County Stadium on June 5. Slaughter gave up only one earned run on six hits and three walks, striking out eight.

References

External links

1941 births
Living people
Amarillo Gold Sox players
Arizona State University alumni
Baseball players from Illinois
Chicago Cubs players
Dallas–Fort Worth Spurs players
Major League Baseball pitchers
Salt Lake City Bees players
Tacoma Cubs players